Chawton House is a Grade II* listed Elizabethan manor house in Hampshire. It is run as a historic property  and also houses the research library of The Centre for the Study of Early Women's Writing, 1600–1830, using the building's connection with the English novelist Jane Austen.

Chawton House, just outside the village of that name, used to be the home of the writer's brother, Edward Austen Knight. It remained a private family home into the late 20th century. At the turn of the millennium it was purchased by a charitable trust, extensively restored, and re-opened as a research centre. The centre, which runs study programmes in association with the nearby University of Southampton, incorporates a significant library, a collection of over 9000 books and related manuscripts.  The house is now open to visitors, as well as library readers, for tours and during public events.

The house 
The present Chawton House was built in 1580, principally by John Knight. Based on a manor house owned by the Knight family since 1551, it was subsequently extended and altered  about 1655 and again in the 18th and 19th centuries. The house is built of flint with stone dressings and a tiled roof. The 17th-century south front has two storeys with an attic and three gables.

John Knight served as MP for Lymington from 1593 to 1597 and High Sheriff of Hampshire for 1609–10. The house passed down in the family until the male line failed with the death of Sir Richard Knight, after which it was devised to a relative by marriage, Richard Martin, who thereupon changed his name to Knight. It then passed to Thomas Brodnax, a relative, who did the same. His son, Thomas Knight, died childless and bequeathed the house to his distant relative Edward Austen, the elder brother of Jane Austen, who also added Knight to his name. It then descended in that last Knight family until inherited in poor condition by Richard Knight in 1987, who sold it in 1992.

The library
In 1992 a 125-year lease on the house was purchased for £1.25 million by a foundation established by Sandra Lerner and Leonard Bosack, co-founders of Cisco Systems.

Opened in 2003, it has a collection of over 9,000 books together with related original manuscripts. The library works in partnership with the University of Southampton, and provides an important resource for the university's MA in 18th Century Study.

In 2015 the house opened to visitors (not only scholars). In 2016 Lerner resigned from the board and her foundation has since directed its funds to other projects.

The Library is now The Centre for the Study of Early Women's Writing, 1600–1830.

Women Writers 
Chawton House Library is an independent research library and study centre which focuses on women's writing in English from 1600 to 1830. The library's main aim is to promote and facilitate study in the field of early women's writing.

Below is a list of some of the female authors whose works are to be found at the Library. The full on-line catalogue is searchable, and can be accessed via the Chawton House website.

Knight Collection

The Library also houses the Knight Collection, a private collection of books belonging to the Knight family who owned and lived at Chawton House for 400 years. This collection of books was once owned by Edward Austen Knight, the brother of Jane Austen, and it is known that she used this collection of books. The library was started by Sandra Lerner, co-founder of Cisco Systems and philanthropist.

Novels Online project 

The Novels Online ongoing project makes freely accessible the  full-text transcripts of some of the rarest works in the Chawton House Library collection to stimulate interest in these works amongst a new generation of readers. 
These texts explore broad-ranging themes including satire, slavery, marriage, witchcraft and piracy.

The texts are completely unedited, and have been copied from the originals as accurately as possible. Even printer errors have been retained.

Chawton House Library: Women's Novels
Routledge has published, to date, thirty-four novels from the Chawton Library collections as part of their Chawton House Library: Women's Novels series.

 [Anon.] Celia in Search of a Husband: By a Modern Antique. Ed. Caroline Franklin, 2022. 
 [Anon.] The Histories of Some of the Penitents in the Magdalen House. 1759. Ed. Jennie Batchelor and Megan Hiatt, 2016. 
 Marguerite Blessington. Marmaduke Herbert; or, the Fatal Error. 1847. Ed. Susanne Schmid, 2018. 
 Frances Brooke. The History of Lady Julia Mandeville. 1763. Ed. Enit Karafili Steiner, 2016. 
 Mary Brunton. Discipline. 1814. Ed. Olivia Murphy, 2018. 
 Mary Brunton. Self-Control. 1811. Ed. Anthony Mandal, 2016. 
 Sarah Harriet Burney. The Romance of Private Life. 1839. Ed. Lorna Clark, 2016. 
 Sophie Cottin. Malvina. 1803. Ed. Marijn S. Kaplan, 2015. 
 Charlotte Dacre. Confessions of the Nun of St Omer. 1805. Ed. Lucy Cogan, 2016. 
 Dorothea Du Bois. Theodora, A Novel. 1770. Ed. Lucy Cogan, 2021. 
 Sarah Fielding. The History of the Countess of Dellwyn. 1759. Ed. Gillian Skinner, 2022. 
 E. M. Foster. The Corinna of England, or a Heroine in the Shade; A Modern Romance. Ed. Sylvia Bordoni, 2016. 
 Stephanie-Felicite De Genlis. Adelaide and Theodore. Ed. Gillian Dow, 2016. 
 Phebe Gibbes. The History of Lady Louisa Stroud, and the Honourable Miss Caroline Stretton. 1764. Ed. Mike Franklin, 2022. 
 Ann Gomersall. The Citizen. 1790. Ed. Margaret S. Yoon, 2016. 
 Sarah Green. The Private History of the Court of England. 1808. Ed. Fiona Price, 2016. 
 Sarah Green. Romance Readers and Romance Writers. 1810. Ed. Christopher Goulding, 2016. 
 Anna Maria Hall. Sketches of Irish Character. 1829; 1844. Ed. Marion Durnin, 2016. 
 Elizabeth Ham. The Ford Family in Ireland. 1845. Ed. Jennifer Martin. Forthcoming, 2022. 
 Mary Hays. Family Annals, or the Sisters. 1817. Ed. Li-ching Chen. Forthcoming, 2022. 
 Eliza Haywood. The Invisible Spy. 1755. Ed. Carol Stewart, 2016. 
 Eliza Haywood. The Rash Resolve and Life's Progress. 1724; 1748. Ed. Carol Stewart, 2016. 
 Elizabeth Hervey. The History of Ned Evans. Ed. Helena Kelly, 2016. 
 Christian Isobel Johnstone. Clan-Albin: A National Tale. 1815. Ed. Juliette Shields. Forthcoming, 2022. 
 Elizabeth Hays Lanfear. Fatal Errors; or Poor Mary-Anne. A Tale of the Last Century. 1819. Eds. Timothy Whelan and Felicity James, 2019. 
 Alicia LeFanu. Strathallan. 1816. Ed. Anna M Fitzer, 2016. 
 Isabelle de Montolieu. Caroline of Lichtfield. Trans. Thomas Holcroft, 1816. Ed. Laura Kirkley, 2016. 
 Sydney Owenson. Florence Macarthy: An Irish Tale. 1818. Ed. Jenny McAuley, 2016. 
 Translations and Continuations: Riccoboni and Brooke, Graffigny and Roberts. Ed. Marijn S Kaplan, 2016. 
 Elizabeth Sophia Tomlins. The Victim of Fancy. 1787. Ed. Daniel Cook, 2016. 
 Helen Maria Williams. Julia. 1790. Ed. Natasha Duquette, 2016.

The gardens 
The gardens are open to the public, with access to a tearoom. The restoration programme for the gardens was extensive, and focused in particular on the restoration of the walled garden. Edward Knight had the idea to build a new walled garden during Jane Austen's lifetime. In 1813, she wrote to her brother Frank, "He [Knight] talks of making a new Garden; the present is a bad one & ill situated, near Mr Papillon's; — he means to have the new, at the top of the Lawn behind his own house." Knight's original walls are mostly still intact, but the glasshouses and potting sheds, had to be rebuilt. The gardens have been restored using Edward Austen Knight's original planting scheme. The central space is used for the production of vegetables, soft fruits, herbs and flowers. Chawton House is registered with the Soil Association, and is now certified as an organic producer. Everything grown in the walled garden is for use by the Library, with any surplus being sold locally in aid of the charity.

The park and gardens of Chawton House are Grade II listed on the Register of Historic Parks and Gardens.

The Jane Austen connection 

Chawton house is situated about 400m away from the cottage where Austen lived for the last eight years of her life. This now houses the Jane Austen's House Museum, which is a large 17th-century house in the centre of the village of Chawton, owned by the Jane Austen Memorial Trust since 1947  and preserved in her memory. The two houses, Chawton House and Jane Austen's House, are separately run charities.

Austen is known to have been a frequent visitor to what she knew as the 'Great House', and she references it a number of times in her letters. Edward Austen also loaned it to his brother, Francis Austen. Edward Austen himself resided at Godmersham Park, but his son, Edward Knight II, moved to Chawton House following his marriage, and sold Godmersham Park following his father's death.

Chawton House is the venue of the Annual General Meeting of the Jane Austen Society of the United Kingdom. In 2003 the Jane Austen Society of North America held its 25th Anniversary AGM in the grounds of Chawton House.

Visiting Chawton House 

Chawton House & Gardens is open to the public seven days a week. Members of the public can tour the house and gardens. Access to the Library itself is available, free of charge, to members of the public who would like to use the library collections.

Events 

Events are held regularly at the library, covering a range of topics relating to the House and Gardens, and material held by the Library; these include:
 Lectures and Talks by Visiting Fellows and other experts
 Exhibitions
 Arts Events
 Other Events, including Heritage Open Days, Garden Tours, and Early Morning Rambles.

The Library also offers educational visits to schools, colleges and universities allowing the chance for teachers and students to engage with a variety of themes within a working, historic building. Both a formal programme of sessions and a bespoke service, to study specific areas in more detail, can be provided.

References

Sources
 Wheeler, Michael. "Chawton House Library: Transforming the Literary Landscape."  Early Modern Literary Studies 6.3 (January, 2001): 9.1-16 <URL: http://purl.oclc.org/emls/06-3/chawton.htm>.
Laura Tennant "A WRITER AT LARGE: Sandy Lerner's Persuasion". Independent on Sunday, The. 20 July 2003. FindArticles.com. 3 January 2008. http://findarticles.com/p/articles/mi_qn4159/is_20030720/ai_n12741978

External links

Hampshire County Council: "Chawton – Jane's literary home"
Jane Austen Society of North America
Jane Austen Society of the United Kingdom
Soil Association

Museums in Hampshire
Country houses in Hampshire
Tourist attractions in Hampshire
Literary museums in England
Grade II listed parks and gardens in Hampshire
Grade II* listed buildings in Hampshire
Historic house museums in Hampshire
Places associated with Jane Austen